The 2002 Hungarian Grand Prix was a Formula One motor race held at Hungaroring on 18 August 2002.

The 77-lap race was won by Brazilian driver Rubens Barrichello, driving a Ferrari. Barrichello's German teammate Michael Schumacher finished second, thus enabling Ferrari to clinch their fourth consecutive Constructors' Championship. Schumacher's brother Ralf finished third in a Williams-BMW.

British driver Anthony Davidson made his F1 debut at this race for the Minardi team. Davidson replaced Malaysia's Alex Yoong, who had failed to qualify for a Grand Prix on three occasions in 2002. The Arrows team did not arrive due to ongoing financial troubles.

Classification

Qualifying

Race

Championship standings after the race 
Bold text indicates the World Champions.

Drivers' Championship standings

Constructors' Championship standings

References

Hungarian Grand Prix
Hungarian Grand Prix
Grand Prix
August 2002 sports events in Europe